The Takutu Formation is a Late Jurassic geologic formation in Guyana and northern Brazil. The formation comprises sandstones deposited in a shallow water to littoral setting. Fossil theropod tracks (a type of dinosaur) have been reported from the formation. A paleobotanic analysis of drill cores of the formation was conducted by Thomas van der Hammen in 1966 and showed fossil Classiopolis flora.

See also 
 List of dinosaur-bearing rock formations
 List of stratigraphic units with theropod tracks
 List of fossiliferous stratigraphic units in Guyana

References

Bibliography

Further reading 
 R. B. McConnell, D. M. Smith, and J. P. Berrangé. 1969. Geological and geophysical evidence for a rift valley in the Guiana Shield. Geologie en Mijnbouw 48(2):189-199

Geologic formations of Brazil
Geologic formations of Guyana
Jurassic System of South America
Late Jurassic South America
Jurassic Brazil
Mesozoic Guyana
Sandstone formations
Ichnofossiliferous formations
Formations